Hermanus van Wyk (1835–1905) was the first Kaptein of the Baster community at Rehoboth in South-West Africa, today Namibia. Under his leadership, the mixed-race Basters moved from the Northern Cape to leave white racial discrimination, and migrated into the interior of what is now central Namibia; the first 30 families settled about 1870. They acquired land from local natives and were joined by additional Baster families over the following years. The Baster people developed their own constitution, called the Paternal Laws (Vaderlike Wette in Afrikaans). They relied on the herding of sheep, goats and cattle as the basis of their economy. 

Outnumbered by the native Damara, Nama and Herero peoples, the Basters had periodic conflict with them in the late 1870s and 1880s, when the latter two groups were also in conflict. They suffered losses of valuable livestock. After the German Empire annexed South-West Africa as a colony, van Wyk negotiated a kind of autonomy for Rehoboth and the land around it through a protection treaty with the Germans in 1885. In the early 1900s, the Basters joined the Germans in a colonial war against the Nama and Herero. Since Namibia gained independence in 1990, the Basters lost considerable land. While the community is influenced by their Paternal Laws, the area is under a local town council.

Trek to South-West Africa

van Wyk was born in 1835 to a mixed-race Baster family in the Fraserburg district in the Cape Colony, today South Africa. His mixed-race clan was living at De Tuin in the Northern Cape until 1868 when they decided to leave the Cape Colony because of the discrimination and harassment they faced from white people. van Wyk was already the clan's leader at that time. They trekked via Pella, then crossed the Orange River, and arrived at Berseba in 1870. Scouts of the Baster clan discovered the fertile area around Rehoboth, which at that time had largely been abandoned by the Nama people after they had been attacked by the Orlam Afrikaners in 1864.

Development of Rehoboth

In 1870, Abraham Swartbooi of the Nama allowed the Basters to settle at Rehoboth for an initial payment of eight horses and an annual rent of one horse. They arrived at Rehoboth in October that year. They worked to repair and develop the existing infrastructure. Under van Wyk's leadership of the Kaptein's council, the Basters drafted a constitution (literally ). By 1876, their community consisted of 800 people; they owned 20,000 sheep and between 2,000 and 3,000 cattle.

Due to the relative wealth that the community had accumulated, van Wyk attempted to buy the land around Rehoboth from Swartbooi. An option on the land was granted at a price of £2,750, but Swartbooi would not sell the land just yet. When the Herero-Nama War of 1880 began, the Basters joined sides with Jan Jonker Afrikaner and the Nama under Swartbooi against the Herero. A Baster merchant group was killed by the Herero. In 1882, however, the Basters were attacked by their Nama allies. They defeated the attack but lost substantial numbers of livestock stolen in the attack and other raids.

Protection treaty

The Nama sold the land around Rehoboth to an agent for the Dorsland Trekkers but, before the Boers could settle there, the German Empire claimed German South-West Africa as a colony. On 15 September 1885, van Wyk and the Germans signed a "Treaty of Protection and Friendship"; this permitted the Basters to retain a degree of autonomy in exchange for accepting colonial rule. As this treaty contained no sale of land but rather a recognition that the territory occupied by the Basters was theirs, no money was changing hands in the deal. Later in the Herero and Nama War of 1904–1908, the Basters would side with the Germans against the native peoples. Not many Basters fought in the conflict. 

Hermanus van Wyk died in Rehoboth in 1905. The German colonial authorities did not approve a successor and instead established the Basterrat. After the outbreak of World War I, in 1914 the United Kingdom took over the area as a British Protectorate, administered by South Africa beginning in 1915. Cornelius van Wyk was elected in 1914 to succeed Hermanus van Wyk.

References

External links
 History of the Baster community in Namibia , Rehoboth Basters website 

1835 births
1905 deaths
People from Karoo Hoogland Local Municipality
Namibian chiefs
Namibian people of South African descent